Niki Sharma  is a Canadian politician and lawyer, who was elected to the Legislative Assembly of British Columbia in the 2020 British Columbia general election. She represents the electoral district of Vancouver-Hastings as a member of the British Columbia New Democratic Party (BC NDP) and serves as Attorney General of British Columbia.

Early life and career
Born in Lethbridge, Alberta, Sharma grew up in Sparwood, British Columbia with her three sisters. Her parents immigrated from India; her father Pal ran a small business in Sparwood, while her mother Rose ran for municipal council three times without being elected.

After graduating from the University of Alberta Faculty of Law, she joined Vancouver law firm Donovan & Company in 2005, specializing in aboriginal law. Prior to her election to the legislature, Sharma served as vice-chair of the board of directors for Vancity since 2016, and Senior Oil and Gas Campaigner for Stand.earth, an environmental organization founded in 2000.

Politics
She ran as a Vision Vancouver candidate in the 2011 Vancouver municipal election and was elected a commissioner of the Vancouver Park Board, at one point serving as chair of the board. She then ran under the Vision banner for Vancouver City Council in the 2014 municipal election, but was unsuccessful.

With incumbent Vancouver-Hastings Member of the Legislative Assembly Shane Simpson declining to run in the 2020 provincial election, Sharma was named the BC NDP candidate for the riding, and won the seat with 60.6% of the vote. On November 26, 2020, Sharma was named Parliamentary Secretary for Community Development and Non-Profits by Premier John Horgan.

On December 7, 2022, she was appointed by Premier David Eby as Attorney General of British Columbia, and therefore, automatically became a King's Counsel. She became the first South Asian Canadian woman to serve in that cabinet post.

Electoral record

References

21st-century Canadian politicians
21st-century Canadian women politicians
British Columbia New Democratic Party MLAs
Women MLAs in British Columbia
Politicians from Vancouver
Attorneys General of British Columbia
Canadian King's Counsel
University of Alberta Faculty of Law alumni
Canadian politicians of Indian descent
Canadian women lawyers
Living people
Year of birth missing (living people)